Jayapa or Jaya was a military commander (senani or senapati) under the Kakatiya king Ganapati-deva (r. c. 1199-1262 CE), whose core territory included the Telugu-speaking region in prsent-day Andhra Pradesh and Telangana.

Jayapa was a member of the Ayya family of the Divi island in the Krishna River delta. After Ganapati invaded the island, his family accepted the Kakatiya suzerainty, and Jayapa entered the Kakatiya service as a military commander. Ganapati later appointed him as the governor of newly-conquered territories, including Vela-nadu.

Jayapa wrote Nritta Ratnavali, a Sanskrit-language treatise on dancing and choreography.

Early life 

Jayapa, also known as Jaya, belonged to the Ayya family of the Divi island in the Krishna River delta. According to scholar Chintamani Lakshmanna, he belonged to the Kamma caste.

Jayapa's father Pinni Choda (or Pina Chodi) was the ruler of the island. The Kakatiya king Ganapati invaded the island sometime around or before 1203 CE, as suggested by the 1203 CE Kondaparti inscription and another 1241 CE inscription of his Malayala chiefs. The Ayyas accepted the Kakatiya suzerainty, and Ganapati allowed them to retain the control of the island. Jayapa entered the Kakatiya service as a commander (senapati or senani), as attested by his 1231 CE Ganapeshvaram inscription. His sisters - Naramba and Peramba - married Ganapati.

Military career 

Ganapati appointed Jayapa of Ayya family as the govenror of the newly-conquered Vela-nadu region, as attested by his 1213 CE Chebrolu inscription. The appointment possibly happened earlier than 1213 CE, but this is not certain, as Jayapa's Chandavolu inscription is partially built in a wall, rendering its date unreadable.

The 1213 CE Chebrolu inscription of Jayapa refers to Ganapati's military campaign against the southern kings. It states that upon his return from this campaign, Ganapati conferred the lordship of the southern region to Jayapa. The identity of hte "southern region is not certain, but they were most probably the Nellore Choda chiefs, who were Chola vassals. Ganapati installed Tikka, a member of the Nellore Choda family and a rival claimaint to the throne, as the ruler of Nellore. The 1231 CE Ganapeshvaram inscription of Jayapa states that he subdued several countries including Chola, Kalinga, Seuna, Brihat-Karnata, and Lata; he also annexed Vela-nadu and Dvipa (Divi). It appears that Tikka faced invasion from rulers or chiefs belonging to these countries, and Ganapati helped Tikka repulse their invasion.

Jayapa led the Kakatiya elephant force, as suggested by his title gaja-senani ("elephant commander").

Cultural contributions 

Jayapa composed Nritta Ratnavali (IAST: Nṛtta Ratnāvalī), a Sanskrit-language treatise on dancing and choreography. Both Desi and Margi forms of dances have been described in Nritta Ratnavali. It contains eight chapters. Folk dance forms like Perani, Prenkhana, Suddha Nartana, Carcari, Rasaka, Danda Rasaka, Shiva Priya, Kanduka Nartana, Bhandika Nrityam, Carana Nrityam, Chindu, Gondali and Kolatam are described. In the first chapter the author deals with discussion of the differences between Marga and desi, tandava and lasya, Natya and nritta. In the 2nd and 3rd chapters he deals with angikabhinaya, caris, Sthanakas and mandalas. In the 4th Chapter Karnas, angaharas and recakas are described. In following chapters he described the local dance forms i.e. desi nritya. In the last chapter he deals with art and practice of dance.

Jayapa built a temple (Ganapeswara) in the honour of Ganapatideva and made a grant of many villages to the temple (1231 CE). He built another temple (Chodeswara) in the name of his father Pinna Choda in Chebrolu (Guntur district) and made a grant of Modukuru village to meet the temple expenses. According to the Chebrolu inscription (21 April 1235 CE) he also built two-storied quarters in two rows for Devadasis (Temple dancers) in front of the temple.

References

Bibliography 

 
 
 

13th-century Indian writers
Kakatiya kingdom
Telugu people
Sanskrit writers